The Matterhorn is a mountain of the Alps.

Matterhorn may also refer to:

Mountains

Canada
 Matterhorn Peak (British Columbia), near the town of Bella Coola
 Matterhorn Peak, the highest summit of the Dunn Peak massif near Clearwater, British Columbia

United States
 Matterhorn (Nevada)
 Matterhorn (Oregon)
 Matterhorn Peak, California
 Matterhorn Peak (Colorado)
 Little Matterhorn (Montana)

Elsewhere
 Gaurjunda, commonly known as Dhauladhar Matterhorn, in the Dhauladhar range of the Himalayas
 Matterhorn (Antarctica)
 Neny Matterhorn, Antarctica
 Klein Matterhorn (or Little Matterhorn), in the vicinity of the Matterhorn
 Little Matterhorn (Heard Island), Australian external territory

Other places 
 Matterhorn Museum, in Zermatt
 Matterhorn Glacier
 Matterhorn Glacier (Antarctica)

Art, entertainment and media
 Matterhorn (album), a 2017 album by Heaters
 Matterhorn (film), a 2013 Dutch film
 Matterhorn: A Novel of the Vietnam War, a 2010 novel by Karl Marlantes

Rides
 Matterhorn (ride), an amusement ride
 Matterhorn Bobsleds, a Disneyland attraction

Other uses
 Tony Matterhorn (born 1972), Jamaican dancehall deejay and selector
 Opencast Matterhorn, music software
 Operation Matterhorn, a military operations plan of the US Army Air Forces in World War II
 Project Matterhorn, a secret project in the 1950s to create nuclear fusion power
 Matterhorn, a tapped horn subwoofer
 Reichmuth Matterhorn, a hedge fund

See also
 List of references to the Matterhorn